Garganoaetus is an extinct genus of buteonin accipitrid bird of prey from the early Pliocene in Italy. G. freudenthali was comparable in size to a golden eagle; G. murivorus was hawk sized.  Species of Garganoaetus would have lived alongside other Gargano island animals, such as large dormice Stertomys and Hattomys hamsters, the giant, long-skulled Deinogalerix moonrats, an otter, Prolagus pikas, and the multi-horned artiodactyl Hoplitomeryx.

References

Accipitridae
Extinct birds of Europe
Fossil taxa described in 1973
Pliocene birds
Prehistoric bird genera